The Age of Information (formerly known as Trading Yesterday) was an American band originally formed in 2002 by David Hodges and Mark Colbert, and later joined by Steven McMorran.  In 2004, The Age of Information released a demo CD titled The Beauty and the Tragedy, and after signing with Epic Records later that year, they released their first single, "One Day", in the summer of 2005, along with an announcement for the upcoming album "More Than This".  After a premature end to their contract with Epic Records, the album "More Than This" was shelved until 2011, when it was finally released independently by David Hodges' Sleepwalker Records.

History
In 2000, Hodges was asked to join the band Evanescence as keyboardist for what would become the demo CD Origin.  After Evanescence finished recording their debut album Fallen in 2002, Hodges left the band to pursue other musical interests.  In 2003, Hodges and Colbert began to collaborate and formed Trading Yesterday, recording music from an apartment setup.  McMorran would later join the band.

On May 15, 2004, The Age of Information held a CD release party for The Beauty and the Tragedy, a demo album recorded in Hodges' apartment.  The demo sold out in a matter of months and attracted the attention of Epic Records, resulting in the band's move to Los Angeles, California to begin work in their major label debut.  By November, studio work on the album was complete and final string arrangements were recorded in December.  Mixing was finished during the first half of 2005, and by May the single "One Day" was released.  However, the band parted with Epic Records on November 30, 2005 for unstated reasons. After the sudden and premature ending of Trading Yesterday's contract with Epic Records prior to the album's release, More Than This was shelved.

After returning to independent status, the band had their first album The Beauty and the Tragedy reprinted for sale on February 25, 2006.  Due to leaving Epic, the debut album More Than This was unable to be released due to licensing. However, the entire album leaked to the internet in December 2006.  On June 27, 2006, Colbert opted to leave Trading Yesterday to pursue a career as an audio engineer.

Around August 2007, the band stopped performing and writing new music under the name Trading Yesterday.  Musicians Josh Dunahoo and Will "Science" Hunt joined Hodges and McMorran, and it was announced that the band would change their name from "Trading Yesterday" to "The Age of Information", with an EP, Everything is Broken, released on September 11, 2007.

Band members

Current
 David Hodges — vocals, guitars and piano (2003–present)
 Steven McMorran — bass, background vocals (2003–present)
 Josh Dunahoo — guitar (2003–present)
 Will "Science" Hunt — drums (2006–present)

Former
 Mark Colbert — drums (2003–2006)

Discography
Albums and EPs
The Beauty and the Tragedy (May 15, 2004; demo CD)
More Than This (2006; unreleased. 2011; self-published release)
Everything is Broken (September 11, 2007; EP)
Singles
One Day (May 4, 2005)

References

External links
The Age of Information on Myspace

Alternative rock groups from Arkansas
Musical groups from Little Rock, Arkansas